Estelle Cascino and Jessika Ponchet were the defending champions, but Cascino chose not to participate. Ponchet partnered with Renata Voráčová, but lost to Conny Perrin and Iryna Shymanovich in the semifinals.

Sofya Lansere and Oksana Selekhmeteva won the title, defeating Perrin and Shymanovich in the final, 6–3, 6–0.

Seeds

Draw

Draw

References
Main Draw

2023 ITF Women's World Tennis Tour